There are over 20,000 Grade II* listed buildings in England.  This page is a list of these buildings in the district of Redditch in Worcestershire.

Redditch

|}

Notes

References 
English Heritage Images of England

External links

Redditch
 Redditch
Lists of listed buildings in Worcestershire
Redditch